Nova Zembla is a Belgian electronic music record label, daughter of Kk Records. It has worked with artists such as Black Lung, Xingu Hill, Shaolin Wooden Men, Little Nobody and Zen Paradox, as well as with the former Melbourne label IF? Records, now based in Tokyo.

See also
 List of record labels

External links 
 Nova Zembla at Discogs
 IF? website

Belgian record labels
Electronic music record labels
Industrial record labels